Peggy is a female first name (often curtailed to "Peg") derived from Meggy, a diminutive version of the name Margaret.

People

Writers

 Peggy Dunstan (1920–2010), New Zealand poet and writer
Peggy Frew (born 1976), Australian author
Peggy Kornegger, American writer
Peggy McIntosh (born 1934), American writer and activist
Peggy Noonan (born 1950), American author and commentator
Peggy Parish (1927–1988), American author

In entertainment
Peggy Ashcroft, English actress
Peggy Bacon (radio producer) aka "Aunty Peggy" - BBC radio and television producer and radio presenter
Peggy Cass, American actress
Peggy Cummins, Irish actress
Peg Entwistle, English actress
Peggy Knudsen, American actress
Peggy Lipton, American actress
Peggy McIntaggart, Canadian model
Peggy Mount, English actress
Peggy Ryan, American dancer and actress
Peggy Shannon, American actress
Peggy Wood, American actress
Peggy Joyce, American actress
Diana Serra Cary, known as Baby Peggy, American child actress

In music
Peggy Gordon (singer), American musical theatre singer
Peggy Gou, South Korean DJ and musician
Peggy Lee, American jazz singer
Peggy Lennon, American singer, one of the Lennon Sisters
Peggy March, American pop singer
Peggy Seeger, American folk singer
Peggy Zina, Greek 'laika' singer

In sports
Peggy Assinck, Canadian ice sledge hockey player and neuroscientist
Peggy Büchse, German long-distance swimmer
Peggy Fleming, American figure skater

In politics
Peggy Cabral, Dominican politician, diplomat and TV presenter
Peggy Duff, British political activist
Peggy Nash, Canadian politician
Peggy Schierenbeck, German politician

Other professions
Peggy Ahwesh (born 1954), American video artist
Peggy Eaton (1799–1879), American, wife of John Henry Eaton and figure in the Petticoat affair
Peggy Fairbairn-Dunlop, Samoan-New Zealand academic
Peggy Hård (1825–1894), Swedish clerk
Peggy Hettrick (died 1987), American murder victim
Peggy Johnson (1976–1999), American murder victim
Margaret "Peggy" Shippen (1760–1804), American Loyalist spy for the British and second wife of Benedict Arnold
Peggy Spicer (1908–1984), New Zealand painter
Margarita "Peggy" Schuyler Van Rensselaer (1758–1801), sister in law of Alexander Hamilton
Peggy Whitson (born 1960), American astronaut

Fictional characters
Peggy Biggs, in the American TV series Mike & Molly
Peggy Blackett, a character in Arthur Ransome's "Swallows and Amazons" books
Peggy Bundy, in the American sitcom Married... with Children
Peggy Carter, a Marvel Comics character
Peg Gallagher, from the TV show Shameless
Peggy Hill, in the American animated TV series King of the Hill
Peggy Matsuyama (aka Momoranger), in Himitsu Sentai Gorenger
Peggy Mitchell, in the British soap opera EastEnders
Peggy Ollerenshaw, in the British TV comedy series Hi-De-Hi!
Peggy Olson, in the American TV series Mad Men
Peggy Patch, a rag doll puppet in the BBC children's TV series Playdays
Peggy, a Hunter × Hunter character
Peggy, a classmate of Wanda in the children's book The Hundred Dresses
Peggy Blumquist, character from season 2 of American TV series Fargo

References

 
English feminine given names
Feminine given names
Given names derived from gemstones
Hypocorisms